Lorenzo Musante (−17 April 1780) was an Italian pipe organ builder.

1730 births
1780 deaths
Businesspeople from Genoa
Italian pipe organ builders
18th-century Italian businesspeople